Peter Downton Croft (7 July 1933 – 18 July 2021) was an England and Great Britain field hockey player, a member of the British squad at the 1960 Summer Olympics, and also a first-class cricketer. He was usually known as Peter Croft. From 1953 to 1955 he served as a second lieutenant in the Royal Regiment of Artillery.

Sporting life
Educated at Gresham's School, Holt, where he attended the junior and senior schools between 1945 and 1952, and then at the University of Cambridge, Croft excelled in two sports, hockey and cricket, representing his school and university at both.

At hockey, after gaining his Blue at Cambridge, Croft played for Surbiton, Surrey and later for the England national field hockey team. He represented Great Britain at the 1960 Summer Olympics in Rome.

Croft's first-class cricket career representing Cambridge University ran from 1955 to 1957 and gained him another Blue. He was a right-hand batsman and a right-arm offbreak bowler, with a batting average of 14.88.

Personal life and death
Croft died on 18 July 2021, at the age of 88.

References

External links
 

1933 births
2021 deaths
English cricketers
Cambridge University cricketers
English male field hockey players
Field hockey players at the 1960 Summer Olympics
Olympic field hockey players of Great Britain
British male field hockey players
People educated at Gresham's School
Royal Artillery officers
Free Foresters cricketers
Surbiton Hockey Club players